The Times of Harvey Milk is a 1984 American documentary film that premiered at the Telluride Film Festival, the New York Film Festival, and then on November 1, 1984, at the Castro Theatre in San Francisco. The film was directed by Rob Epstein, produced by Richard Schmiechen, and narrated by Harvey Fierstein, with an original score by Mark Isham.

In 2012, this film was deemed "culturally, historically, or aesthetically significant" by the United States Library of Congress and selected for preservation in the National Film Registry.

Premise
The Times of Harvey Milk documents the political career of Harvey Milk, who was San Francisco's first openly gay supervisor. The film documents Milk's rise from a neighborhood activist to a symbol of gay political achievement, through to his assassination in November 1978 at San Francisco's city hall, and the Dan White trial and aftermath.

Participants
Narrator
 Harvey Fierstein

Interview subjects
 Anne Kronenberg (city hall aide to Harvey Milk)
 Tory Hartmann (political consultant)
 Tom Ammiano (schoolteacher)
 Jim Elliot (auto machinist)
 Henry Der (executive director, Chinese for Affirmative Action)
 Jeannine Yeomans (TV reporter)
 Bill Kraus (gay activist)
 Sally M. Gearhart (speech professor)

Archive footage
 Dianne Feinstein
 Harvey Milk
 George Moscone
 Dan White
 John Briggs
 Jimmy Carter

Featured people
The film was produced after Milk's death using original interviews, exclusive documentary footage, news reports, and archival footage, so that Milk is credited as the lead (posthumously). Other politicians including San Francisco mayor George Moscone (who was assassinated with Milk), and Moscone's successor and now United States Senator Dianne Feinstein appear in archival footage. The film opens with a tearful Feinstein delivering her announcement to the media that Moscone and Milk had been assassinated by Dan White.

Also featured in the film is schoolteacher Tom Ammiano, who would go on to be a member of the California State Assembly.

Awards and honors
The film won the Academy Award for Best Documentary Feature in 1985, and was awarded the Special Jury Prize at the first Sundance Film Festival, among other awards.

Home media
A digitally restored version of the film was released on DVD and Blu-ray by The Criterion Collection in March 2011. The release includes an audio commentary featuring director Rob Epstein, co-editor Deborah Hoffmann, and photographer Daniel Nicoletta; a few interview clips and news clips not used in the film; a new interview with documentary filmmaker Jon Else; a new program about The Times of Harvey Milk and Gus Van Sant’s 2008 film Milk, featuring Epstein, Van Sant, actor James Franco, and Milk's friends Cleve Jones, Anne Kronenberg, and Nicoletta; a rare collection of audio and video recordings of Milk; excerpts from Epstein's preproduction research tapes of interviews he conducted with a number of people who were ultimately not interviewed for the final film, including Milk's partner Scott Smith; footage from the film's Castro Theatre premiere and the 1984 Academy Awards; a panel discussion from 2003 with Dan White's attorneys; and excerpts from the 25th anniversary commemoration of Milk's and Mayor George Moscone's assassinations.

References

External links
 
 
 
Harvey’s Enduring Legacy an essay by Stuart Milk at the Criterion Collection
The Times of Harvey Milk: Making History an essay by B. Ruby Rich at the Criterion Collection

1984 films
1984 documentary films
American documentary films
American LGBT-related films
Films directed by Rob Epstein
Best Documentary Feature Academy Award winners
Documentary films about American politicians
Documentary films about San Francisco
History of LGBT civil rights in the United States
History of San Francisco
1984 LGBT-related films
Documentary films about gay men
LGBT history in San Francisco
Peabody Award-winning broadcasts
Sundance Film Festival award winners
United States National Film Registry films
Harvey Milk
LGBT politics in the United States
Films about activists
Films scored by Mark Isham
Documentary films about violence against LGBT people
1980s English-language films
1980s American films